Nils Kristian "Påsan" Eriksen (5 March 1911 – 5 May 1975) was a Norwegian association football player.

At the 1936 Summer Olympics he was a member of the Norwegian team which won the bronze medal in the football tournament. He also took part in the 1938 FIFA World Cup. He was capped 47 times.

On club level most of his career was spent at Odd, but he rounded off his career at Moss FK. He coached Moss FK.

References

External links
profile

1911 births
1975 deaths
Norwegian footballers
Odds BK players
Moss FK players
Norway international footballers
Footballers at the 1936 Summer Olympics
Olympic footballers of Norway
Olympic bronze medalists for Norway
1938 FIFA World Cup players
Norwegian football managers
Moss FK managers
Olympic medalists in football
Sportspeople from Skien
Medalists at the 1936 Summer Olympics
Association football midfielders